Hewu Hospital is a Provincial government funded hospital in Whittlesea, Eastern Cape in South Africa.

The hospital departments include Emergency department, Paediatric ward, Maternity ward, Out Patients Department, Surgical Services, Medical Services, Operating Theatre & CSSD Services, Pharmacy, Anti-Retroviral (ARV) treatment for HIV/AIDS, Post Trauma Counseling Services, Laboratory Services, X-ray Services, Laundry Services and Kitchen Services.

References
 Eastern Cape Department of Health website - Chris Hani District Hospitals

Hospitals in the Eastern Cape
Enoch Mgijima Local Municipality